Atrophaneura nox, the Malayan batwing, is a papilionid butterfly found in Java, northern Borneo and Peninsular Malaysia.

Description
The species is black with blue metallic reflections. On the forewings the veins are shaded white. There are red hairs on the thorax. The wingspan is 9–11 cm. Females are larger than males.

Subspecies
A. n. nox Java
A. n. noctis (Hewitson, 1859) north Borneo
A. n. erebus (Wallace, 1865) Peninsular Malaya
A. n. noctula (Westwood, 1872) north Borneo
A. n. nyx (de Nicéville, 1897) Bali
A. n. henricus (Fruhstorfer, 1899) north east Sumatra
A. n. banjermasinus (Fruhstorfer, 1899) south Borneo
A. n. solokanus (Fruhstorfer, 1903) south Sumatra
A. n. niepeltiana (Strand, 1914) Sumatra
A. n. petronius (Fruhstorfer, 1901) Nias
A. n. smedleyi (Jordan, 1937) Mentaway Island
A. n. tungensis Zin & Leow, 1982 Sumatra
A. n. mirifica Hanafusa, 1994 Batu Island
A. n. hirokoae Hirata & Miyagawa, 2006 Tuangku Island
A. n. miekoae Hirata & Miyagawa, 2006 Singkep

Status
A widespread but local species in forest localities. It is extinct in Singapore.

References

External links

Butterflycorner Images from Naturhistorisches Museum Wien
Global Butterfly Information System text and images including holotypes of niepeltiana Strand, 1914, rokanus Niepelt, 1926 and solokanus Fruhstorfer, 1903

Atrophaneura
Butterflies of Borneo
Butterflies described in 1822